Yan Ganhui (born February 1962) is a former Chinese politician who spent his entire career in his home-province Jiangxi. As of June 2020 he was under investigation by China's top anti-corruption agency. Previously he served as party secretary of Yichun.

Biography
Yan was born in Chongren County, Jiangxi, in February 1962. After resuming the college entrance examination, in 1978, he was admitted to Jiangxi University of Finance and Economics, majoring in statistics. 

After graduating in 1982, he was despatched to the Bureau of Statistics of Fuzhou, where he was eventually promoted to director in May 1993. He joined the Communist Party of China (CPC) in May 1985. He became magistrate of Jinxi County, a county under the jurisdiction of Fuzhou, in December 1995, and then party secretary, the top political position in the county, beginning in November 1997. He was appointed head of the Organization Department of CPC Shangrao Municipal Committee in September 2000 and one month later was admitted to member of the standing committee of the CPC Shangrao Municipal Committee, the city's top authority. In January 2005, he was appointed vice mayor of Yichun. After this office was terminated in August 2011, he became deputy party secretary of Pingxiang, serving until September 2013, when he was made mayor and deputy party secretary of Jingdezhen. In April 2016, he took office as mayor of Shangrao, he remained in that position until June 2017, when he was transferred to Yichun again and appointed party secretary.

Downfall
On 8 June 2020, he was put under investigation for alleged "serious violations of discipline and laws" by the Central Commission for Discipline Inspection (CCDI), the party's internal disciplinary body, and the National Supervisory Commission, the highest anti-corruption agency of China.

In February 2021, he was expelled from the Communist Party and dismissed from public office. On March 26, he stood trial at the Intermediate People's Court of Xinyu on charges of taking bribes. He was charged with accepting money and property worth over 26.119 million yuan ($4.06 million) personally or through others. According to the indictment, he allegedly took advantage of his positions to seek benefits for others in business restructuring, project contracting and personnel promotions between 2007 and 2020. He was sentenced to 11 years in prison and fine of 2 million yuan on taking bribes.

References

1962 births
Living people
People from Chongren County
Jiangxi University of Finance and Economics alumni
People's Republic of China politicians from Jiangxi
Chinese Communist Party politicians from Jiangxi